Charles Macpherson DMus (Dunelm) FRAM FRCO (10 May 1870 – 28 May 1927) was a Scottish organist, who served at St Paul's Cathedral.

Family
Macpherson was born in Edinburgh on 10 May 1870, to Charles Macpherson, the Burgh Architect, and Mary Charlotte d'Egville. His brother, the Rev. Ranald Macpherson (1871–1951) was sometime Vicar Choral of Ripon Cathedral.

He married Sophia Menella Newbolt (1883–1962), the youngest daughter of the Rev. Canon William Charles Edmund Newbolt, in 1910. Their son, Alasdair Charles Macpherson (born 1911), died in 1941 while serving with the Royal Air Force Volunteer Reserve.

Career
At the age of nine, Macpherson became a chorister at St. Paul's Cathedral, later studying music at the Royal Academy of Music. He was organist at St Clement Eastcheap between 1887 and 1890, before returning to St Paul's as assistant organist between 1895 and 1916, being made organist in 1916, a position he held until his death.

He was Professor of Composition at the Royal Academy of Music and was elected a Fellow. He was President of the Royal College of Organists from 1920 to 1922. Two hymns by Macpherson were included in Hymns Ancient and Modern in 1916 Exsurgat Deus, and Stonypath. He composed a Thanksgiving Te Deum for the thanksgiving service at St Paul's on 6 July 1919, which marked the end of the First World War and was attended by King George V and Queen Mary.

He died suddenly on 28 May 1927.

References

External links

1870 births
1927 deaths
19th-century organists
20th-century organists
19th-century Scottish musicians
20th-century Scottish musicians
20th-century British composers
Academics of the Royal Academy of Music
Alumni of the Royal Academy of Music
Cathedral organists
British male organists
People educated at St. Paul's Cathedral School
Musicians from Edinburgh
Scottish organists
20th-century British male musicians
19th-century British male musicians
Male classical organists